Khazanchi may refer to:

 Khazanchi (1941 film), a Hindi-language film
 Khazanchi (1958 film), a Bollywood film
 Khazanchi, Iran, or Qazanchi, a village in Miyan Darband Rural District, Kermanshah Province